Stade de Genève, also called Stade de la Praille, is a stadium in Lancy, Canton of Geneva. It has a capacity of 30,084.

Overview

The stadium was completed in 2003 by Zschokke Construction S.A. after nearly three years of construction. Normally the home venue of Geneva's Servette FC, a Swiss football team, the stadium hosted international friendlies between Argentina and England on 12 November 2005, which England won 3-2 and between New Zealand and Brazil on 4 June 2006, which Brazil won 4–0. The venue played host to three group-stage matches for Group A during UEFA Euro 2008.

A memorable match Turkey-Czech Republic was played in this stadium. The stadium was also used for rugby union, with a 2006-07 Heineken Cup clash between Bourgoin and Munster being moved from Bourgoin's home ground.

In the summer of 2016 the stadium was equipped with heated hybrid turf, Mixto Hybrid Grass by Limonta Sport to cater the needs of football and rugby clubs of Servette. Installation of the new turf prevented Servette FC from playing home on the first three rounds of the 2016–17 Swiss Challenge League.

Throughout the 2019-20 season, all 30,000 seats were replaced with brand new burgundy seats as the old ones had completely faded to a pink/grey color. In addition to that, a small portion of the North stand was left without seats to provide a new standing section for about 500 fans.

NLA Winter Classic 
On 11 January 2014, the National League A played its second Winter Classic (the first one was held on 14 January 2007 at the Stade de Suisse, Wankdorf). The game featured Genève-Servette HC and Lausanne HC and was played in front of a sellout crowd of 29,400 (the capacity being reduced to 29,400 for security and visibility concerns).

Matches

UEFA Euro 2008
The stadium was one of the venues for the UEFA Euro 2008.

The following games were played at the stadium during the UEFA Euro 2008:

International matches

See also 
List of football stadiums in Switzerland
Rugby union in Switzerland

References

External links

 Stade de Genève

Football venues in Switzerland
Buildings and structures in Geneva
Sport in Geneva
UEFA Euro 2008 stadiums in Switzerland
Rugby union stadiums in Switzerland
Sports venues completed in 2003
Servette FC
2003 establishments in Switzerland
21st-century architecture in Switzerland